Britta Brunius (4 May 1912 – 31 August 2000) was a Swedish film actress. She appeared in more than 30 films between 1935 and 1969. She was married to the actor Ragnar Falck.

Selected filmography
 The Boys of Number Fifty Seven (1935)
 We at Solglantan (1939)
 Bashful Anton (1940)
 I Am Fire and Air (1944)
 Guttersnipes (1944)
 The Invisible Wall (1944)
 Music in Darkness (1948)
 She Came Like the Wind (1952)
 Speed Fever (1953)
 A Night in the Archipelago (1953)
 Men in the Dark (1955)
 The Hard Game (1956)
 The Lady in White (1962)
 The Passion of Anna (1969)

External links

1912 births
2000 deaths
Swedish film actresses
Actresses from Stockholm
20th-century Swedish actresses